Live Connect (previously Messenger Connect, Live Services and Windows Live Dev) is a collection of APIs and common controls that allow developers to have a deeper control and offers access to the core Windows Live services and data through open and easily accessible application programming interfaces (APIs). At MIX07, Microsoft's Senior Architect Danny Thorpe described:

Live Connect is built on standard web technologies such as OAuth 2.0, Representational State Transfer (REST), and JavaScript Object Notation (JSON), and is designed to work with any technology or device including ASP.NET, Microsoft Silverlight (in-browser and out-of-browser models), Windows Presentation Foundation (WPF), Adobe Flash, PHP, and Java.

Live Connect was released on June 24, 2010 as part of Windows Live's "Wave 4" release (known then as Messenger Connect), and unites previously separate APIs of Windows Live (Windows Live ID, Windows Live Contacts, Windows Live Messenger Web Toolkit, and others) into a single API that is based on industry standards and specifications. On September 13, 2011, Messenger Connect was renamed to Live Connect and brings additional APIs for OneDrive and Outlook contacts and calendars as well as adding XMPP support for the Messenger service.

Libraries, interfaces, and controls
Live Connect provides a variety of ways for developers to integrate their applications. Live Connect can be used on websites, in desktop applications, as well as Windows 8 Metro-style apps. Developers may select from several different types of integration, each covering a variety of scenarios, including:
OAuth 2.0
Representational state transfer (REST)
JavaScript Object Notation (JSON)

Live Connect include the following capabilities for websites, applications, and devices:

Windows Live Client Extensibility APIs
In addition, Microsoft also offers Windows Live Client Extensibility APIs for Windows Live Client software such as Windows Live Photo Gallery, Writer, and Messenger. These APIs are separate from Live Connect, and includes the following capabilities:

See also
Windows Live

References

External links
Live Connect
Live Connect Interactive SDK
Live Connect Documentation on MSDN
Windows Live for Developer Blog - official team blog for Windows Live Messenger Connect
Windows Live Plug-ins Developer Information

Messenger Connect
Microsoft application programming interfaces

fr:Windows Live
nl:Windows Live